is a Japanese long-distance runner, who specializes in the marathon. She won the 2008 Tokyo Women's Marathon in a personal best time of 2:23:30 hours. A year later she took the silver medal in the event at the 2009 World Championships in Athletics.

Ozaki has won international team medals with Japan at the IAAF World Cross Country Championships and the IAAF World Half Marathon Championships. She represented Japan in the marathon at the 2012 Summer Olympics. She is coached by former world marathon medallist Sachiko Yamashita.

Career
Born in Kanagawa Prefecture, she made her senior international debut at the 2006 IAAF World Cross Country Championships and although she finished in 19th place, this was enough to help Japan to the women's team bronze medal. She struck team bronze the following year, this time in the 2007 IAAF World Road Running Championships where she finished 13th overall and ran a half marathon personal best of 1:09:26 hours.

Ozaki opened the 2008 season at the Kagawa Marugame International Half Marathon and she came close to her personal best (1:09:30) to take second place behind Philes Ongori. She made her marathon debut that year at the Nagoya International Women's Marathon and she came close to victory, but her time of 2:26:19 was only enough for second place behind Yurika Nakamura (another athlete making her debut over the distance). Her first win came in only her second outing over the distance as she won the 2008 Tokyo International Women's Marathon in a personal record time of 2:23:30.

She qualified herself for the 2009 World Championships in Berlin and she came in second in a time of 2:25:25, only ten seconds behind Chinese winner Bai Xue. Competing at the 2010 All Japan Corporate Team Half Marathon Championships, she took second place behind defending champion Filomena Cheyech, although her performance as the top finishing Japanese athlete earned her a place on the 2010 IAAF World Half Marathon Championships squad. She finished ninth at the championships in Nanning, a placing which led the Japanese women to the team bronze medal.

She ran at the Yokohama Women's Marathon in February 2011 and broke the course record with a time of 2:23:56, gaining herself a place in the Japanese World Championship squad in the process. However, at the 2011 World Championships in Athletics in Daegu she did not produce the same form and finished 18th with a time of 2:32:31 hours. She returned to the Yokohama women's race in November but was defeated by the less well-known Ryoko Kizaki in the final stretch. She secured a place on the Olympic team with a strong performance of 2:24:14 hours at the Nagoya Marathon, where she was the first Japanese and runner-up behind Albina Mayorova. She placed 19th at the 2012 Olympic marathon.

The 2013 Tokyo Marathon saw Ozaki finish as the top Japanese in fifth place.

Achievements
All results regarding marathon, unless stated otherwise

Personal bests

All information taken from IAAF profile.

References

External links

1981 births
Living people
Japanese female long-distance runners
Japanese female marathon runners
Sportspeople from Kanagawa Prefecture
Athletes (track and field) at the 2012 Summer Olympics
Olympic athletes of Japan
Olympic female marathon runners
World Athletics Championships medalists
20th-century Japanese women
21st-century Japanese women